The Richardson Rockets were a soccer club based in Richardson, Texas, United States, a suburb of Dallas. The club originally started in the indoor SISL league. They became the North Texas Mid-Cities Flyers for the 1991/92 USISL indoor league and were renamed the Dallas Rockets beginning with the 1992 outdoor league.

Ron Higgins owned the Rockets in 1992.  Phil Jones coached the team.

Year-by-year

Honors
 U.S. Open Cup
 Runner Up (1): 1991
SI Soccer League (1): 1991
Participations in CONCACAF Champions' Cup: 1992

Sports in the Dallas–Fort Worth metroplex
Defunct soccer clubs in Texas
Rockets
1989 establishments in Texas
1994 disestablishments in Texas
Association football clubs established in 1989
Association football clubs disestablished in 1994
U.S. clubs in CONCACAF Champions' Cup